Todd Johnson (born ) is an American politician from the state of North Carolina. He is a member of the North Carolina Senate from the Republican party, representing the 35th district. He was first elected in November 2018. Johnson is an insurance agent and former commissioner in Union County, North Carolina.

References

External links

1970s births
Republican Party North Carolina state senators
Living people
21st-century American politicians